Iva Lažeta (née Landeka; born 3 October 1989) is a Croatian football midfielder for ŽNK Split. From 2012 until 2016 she played for USV Jena of the German Bundesliga. She previously played for Dinamo Maksimir in the Croatian 1st Division, FC Kärnten in the Austrian Frauenliga and Unia Racibórz in the Polish Ekstraliga, also playing the Champions League with Dinamo and Unia. She is a member of the Croatian national team since 2006.

Early life
Landeka was born in the town of Posušje, Bosnia and Herzegovina, SFR Yugoslavia. She left for Zagreb when she was 14 years old, to pursue her football career.

Club career
In August 2016, Swedish champions FC Rosengård announced that they had agreed to sign Landeka from USV Jena on a two-year contract. Rosengård's sporting director Therese Sjögran said that Landeka was not intended as a direct replacement for the outgoing Sara Björk Gunnarsdóttir, who was a more defensive midfielder.

International career

References

External links

 

1989 births
Living people
Croatian women's footballers
Croatia women's international footballers
FF USV Jena players
Expatriate women's footballers in Austria
Expatriate women's footballers in Poland
Expatriate women's footballers in Germany
Expatriate women's footballers in Sweden
Croats of Bosnia and Herzegovina
People from Posušje
Croatian expatriate sportspeople in Germany
FC Rosengård players
Damallsvenskan players
Croatian expatriate sportspeople in Sweden
Croatian expatriate sportspeople in Poland
Croatian expatriate sportspeople in Austria
Croatian expatriate women's footballers
Women's association football midfielders
Frauen-Bundesliga players
Montpellier HSC (women) players
Division 1 Féminine players
ÖFB-Frauenliga players
Croatian Women's First Football League players
ŽNK Marjan players
ŽNK Dinamo-Maksimir players
Expatriate women's footballers in France
Croatian expatriate sportspeople in France